Sterphus sapphirifer is a species of Hoverfly in the family Syrphidae.

Distribution
Colombia.

References

Eristalinae
Insects described in 1978
Diptera of South America